Sultan Hussein Kamel (21 November 1853 – 9 October 1917) was the Sultan of Egypt from 19 December 1914 to 9 October 1917, during the British protectorate over Egypt. He was the first person to hold the title of Sultan of Egypt since the killing of Sultan Tuman II by the Ottomans in 1517 following their conquest of Egypt.

Life
Hussein Kamel was the second son of Khedive Ismail Pasha, who ruled Egypt from 1863 to 1879. He was declared Sultan of Egypt on 19 December 1914, after the occupying British forces had deposed his nephew, Khedive Abbas Hilmi II, on 5 November 1914. Though presented as the re-establishment of the pre-Ottoman Egyptian sultanate, the newly created Sultanate of Egypt was to be a British protectorate, with effective political and military power vested in British officials. This brought to an end the de jure Ottoman sovereignty over Egypt, which had been largely nominal since Muhammad Ali's seizure of power in 1805.

Upon Hussein Kamel's death, his only son, Prince Kamal el Dine Hussein, declined the succession, and Hussein Kamel's brother Ahmed Fuad ascended the throne as Fuad I. At the beginning of Naguib Mahfouz's novel Palace Walk, Ahmad Abd al-Jawwad says "What a fine man Prince Kamal al-Din Husayn is! Do you know what he did? He refused to ascend the throne of his late father so long as the British are in charge."

Stereoscope photographs of the coronation procession and burial procession of Sultan Hussein are available on the Rare Books and Special Collections Digital Library of the American University in Cairo.

Honours

Domestic
 Founder and Sovereign of the Order of Muhammad Ali
 Founder and Sovereign of the Order of Ismail
 Founder and Sovereign of the Order of the Nile
 Founder and Sovereign of the Order of the Virtues

Foreign
Ottoman Empire: Order of Osmanieh, 1st Class
Ottoman Empire: Order of the Medjidie, 1st Class
Austria-Hungary: Grand Cross of the Order of Franz Joseph, 1869
Sweden: Commander Grand Cross of the Order of the Sword, 1891
United Kingdom of Great Britain and Ireland: Honorary Grand Cross of the Order of the Bath (civil division), 19 December 1914
French Third Republic: Grand Cross of the Legion d'Honneur, 1916
Kingdom of Italy: Grand Cross of the Order of Saints Maurice and Lazarus, 1916
Greece: Grand Cross of the Order of the Redeemer, 1916
Kingdom of Romania: Grand Cross of the Order of the Crown, 1916
Belgium: Grand Cross of the Order of Leopold II, 1917

References

External links 

Stereoscopes of Hussein Kamel's coronation and burial processions

1853 births
1917 deaths
Egyptian Muslims
20th-century Egyptian monarchs
Muhammad Ali dynasty
Sultans of Egypt
Finance Ministers of Egypt
Speakers of the Parliament of Egypt
Honorary Knights Grand Cross of the Order of the Bath

Grand Crosses of the Order of Franz Joseph
Recipients of the Order of the Medjidie, 1st class
Commanders Grand Cross of the Order of the Sword
Grand Croix of the Légion d'honneur
Knights Grand Cross of the Order of Saints Maurice and Lazarus
Grand Crosses of the Order of the Crown (Romania)
Recipients of the Grand Cross of the Order of Leopold II
Field marshals of the Ottoman Empire
Field marshals of Egypt
Irrigation Ministers of Egypt